Wannado City was an indoor role-playing amusement center at the Sawgrass Mills in Sunrise, Florida, a suburb of Fort Lauderdale, Florida. It was a property of Grupo CIE. Billed as "where kids can do what they wanna do," it was a child-sized representation of a metropolis where children aged 2–14 could participate in different careers and other lifelike activities. Luis Javier Laresgoiti created the concept five years prior (1996) when he opened a similar park in Mexico City named "La Ciudad de los Niños", now known as KidZania. Luis sold his shares and left (now)Kidzania to open Wannado City at Sawgrass Mills Mall in Florida. Luis left Wannado City to start a new business named "Kandu", which now focuses on licensing a smaller hybrid model of Wannado City. 

Careers in which the "kidizens" could participate included but were not limited to firefighter, police officer, lawyer, physician, TV reporter, singer, actor, and model. They could also use issued money, "Wongas", to set up bank accounts.

Due to financial problems, alongside lack of business, Wannado City was sold by Stampler Auctions on January 11, 2011. Wannado City closed on January 12, 2011 and was replaced by a new wing of stores called "Fashion Row" in 2013.

Overview

Money system

The system functioned by the idea of participation in different activities, gaining capital and spending their earnings in luxurious locations such as the Wonka Factory, The Coca-Cola Bottling Plant, a Publix supermarket, the Wannado City Fair and a permanent circus. Guests were granted 150 Wongas upon their arrival, and were awarded 20 Wongas for each activity. There were also ATMs where guests could withdraw money or make a deposit at a State Farm bank, so that guests would not have to carry their money around. Children were given "ATM cards" so that they are able to deposit and withdraw more efficiently. The "ATM cards" were discontinued in 2006.

Careers
The city hosted numerous job occupations available for selection. Children could star in their own television newscast, join the city's fire or police department, the Miami Herald and the Spirit Airlines Flight Academy. The city also hosted a theater, circus, hospital, movie studio, recording studio, courthouse, bakery, dentistry office, public park, library, mine, and an archaeological/paleontological site, among other locations.

Security
Upon arrival, the children and parents were given RFID security bracelets. Throughout the park there were computer stands where a person would place their bracelet against a scanner and details of any known individual's location were shown.

References

Defunct amusement parks in Florida
Buildings and structures in Broward County, Florida
2004 establishments in Florida
2011 disestablishments in Florida
Amusement parks opened in 2004
Amusement parks closed in 2011